Rønne Lighthouse ( is located close to the waterfront in Rønne on the Danish island of Bornholm.

History and description
The lighthouse was built by the Bornholm firm H. Wichmann & Co. in 1880, replacing the simple light which had stood on the site. It was brought into service on 27 September 1880, initially with a green light which was soon changed to red. The structure consists of a tapered, white-painted octagonal tower in cast iron with a lantern and gallery. The lantern dome is painted green. The lighthouse was restored and repainted in 2000. It stands between houses slightly back from the harbour waterfront. The lighthouse was taken out of commission in 1989.

See also

List of lighthouses and lightvessels in Denmark

References

Lighthouses completed in 1880
Lighthouses in Denmark
Buildings and structures in Bornholm
Rønne